Couva–Tabaquite–Talparo is one of the nine regions of Trinidad and Tobago, and one of the five regions which form the Gulf of Paria coastline on Trinidad's West Coast. Its regional capital and commercial center is Couva. As of 2011, the population was 178,410.

Couva–Tabaquite–Talparo is bordered by the Gulf of Paria to the west, the Borough of Chaguanas to the north-west, Tunapuna–Piarco region to the north, Sangre Grande and Mayaro–Rio Claro to the east, Princes Town to the south and the City of San Fernando to the south-west. The region is directly adjacent to the Venezuelan state of Monagas to west separated by the Gulf of Paria.

Geography 

Couva–Tabaquite–Talparo is Trinidad and Tobago's third largest region in area after Sangre Grande and Rio Claro–Mayaro. The region is situated in Central Trinidad within the Caroni Plains bordering the Gulf of Paria to west. It was a major region for sugar and cocoa production in the 18th and 19th centuries and the first half of the 20th century. The region features the Caroni–Arena Dam which supplies water to the northern regions of Trinidad and Navet Dam which supplies water to much of Central and Southern regions Trinidad. Much of the Central Range lies in the region which is home to the Brasso Venado and Gran Couva Waterfall. Couva–Tabaquite–Talparo also houses the Pointe-à-Pierre Wild Fowl Trust in Pointe-à-Pierre.

Wildlife

The Point-a-Pierre Wild Fowl Trust is located on the compound of a major petrochemical and oil refinery in south Trinidad. Encompassing two lakes and about 30 hectares of land the Trust is a popular destination for scientists and researchers. The Trust is the only eco-tourism site on the island with a boardwalk built along much of the first pond where there is also a small Amerindian museum. Point-a-Pierre Wild Fowl Trust is a wetland habitat that is home to locally endangered wetland birds. With over 26 hectares, there are about 90 bird species, including endangered waterfowl, songbirds, scarlet ibis, herons and other wading birds.

Demographics

Population
The Trinidad and Tobago Central Statistical Office reported the population of Couva–Tabaquite–Talparo was 178,410 on January 9, 2011, a 0.9% increase since the 2000 Census. The population of Couva–Tabaquite–Talparo in the 2000 census was 162,779.

Ancestry

Religion

Urban Centers and Towns

Electoral Districts 

Electoral Districts within Couva–Tabaquite–Talparo Regional Corporation include:

 Balmain / Calcutta #2
 Brechin Castle / Esperanza
 California / Point Lisas
 Capara / Mamoral
 Caratal / Tortuga
 Carli Bay / Calcutta #3 / Mc Bean 	  	 
 Claxton Bay / Pointe-a-Pierre  
 Freeport / Chickland	  	 	 
 Gasparillo / Bonne Aventure 	  	 
 Las Lomas / San Rafael	  	 
 Longdenville / Talparo	  	 
 Perseverance / Waterloo  	 
 Piparo / San Pedro / Tabaquite
 St Mary’s / Carlsen Field

References

 Local Government Corporations, from Nalis, the National Library and Information Service of Trinidad and Tobago.

External links
 Couva/Tabaquite Talparo Regional Corporation Homepage

Government of Trinidad and Tobago
Regions of Trinidad and Tobago
Trinidad (island)
Couva
Government agencies with year of establishment missing